The Chinese Taipei baseball team is the national men's baseball team of the Republic of China (Taiwan). It is governed by the Chinese Taipei Baseball Association. The team is ranked second in the world by the World Baseball Softball Confederation, behind only Japan. The team is usually made up of professionals from Taiwan's Chinese Professional Baseball League, Japan's Nippon Professional Baseball, and Major League Baseball and Minor League Baseball from the United States.

Originally known as the National Baseball Team of the Republic of China it was renamed in the 1980s as the Chinese Taipei Baseball Team.

The team has won five titles in the Asian Baseball Championship (most recently in 2019), a bronze medal at the 1984 Olympic Games in Los Angeles, and a silver medal at the 1992 Olympic Games in Barcelona. It won the gold medal at the 2006 Asian Games in Doha in a sweeping victory by beating South Korea, Thailand, China, Philippines, and finally all-time rival Japan. It achieved eighth place in the 2013 World Baseball Classic. The team came in fifth in the 12-team 2019 WBSC Premier12 Tournament, in November 2019. The team will try to qualify for the 2020 Olympics at the six-team Final Qualifying Tournament.

Results and fixtures 
The following is a list of professional baseball match results currently active in the latest version of the WBSC World Rankings, as well as any future matches that have been scheduled.

Legend

2019

2023

Current roster

Tournament record

Premier12 Tournament

2015
Team Chinese Taipei came in ninth in the 2015 WBSC Premier12 Tournament.

2019
Team Chinese Taipei came in fifth in the 12-team 2019 WBSC Premier12 Tournament, in November 2019.

World Baseball Classic

World Baseball Classic, 2006

Chinese Taipei participated in the 2006 World Baseball Classic. The squad included players from Major League Baseball. During the Classic, the team played in Pool A but ended up being the third place and did not advance. Their only victory was a 12–3 win over China.

World Baseball Classic, 2009

Chinese Taipei participated in the 2009 World Baseball Classic. The squad included players from Major League Baseball.  During the Classic, the team played in Pool A against the same teams as in 2006.  After losses to South Korea and China, Chinese Taipei was eliminated from the tournament, finishing in 14th place.

World Baseball Classic, 2013

World Baseball Classic, 2017 

Taiwan faced Israel, the Netherlands, and South Korea in the 2017 World Baseball Classic. The Chinese Taipei team lost all three games it played and was eliminated in the first round.

World Baseball Classic, 2023

Chinese Taipei participated in the 2023 World Baseball Classic. The squad faced Cuba, the Netherlands, Italy and Panama. The Chinese Taipei team win over the Netherlands and Italy, lose to  Panama and Cuba. Since all teams in Pool A finished with a 2-2 record, based on tiebreaker rule, Chinese Taipei placed 5th in the pool and was eliminated in the first round.

Qualification

Chinese Taipei was required to participate in the WBC 2013 Qualification as they were eliminated early in the game with 0 wins, along with Canada, Spain and Panama. Chinese Taipei was grouped in Qualifier 4 with other teams invited, Thailand, Philippines and New Zealand. Chinese Taipei defeated New Zealand in the first round with a 10–0 win. It then crushed Philippines 16–0. In the Qualifier Round, it met New Zealand again, this time beating the team 9–0 to gain entry into the WBC 2013, where the team was grouped with South Korea, the Netherlands and Australia. The team did not lose any points in the qualification.

2009 IBAF World Cup

Chinese Taipei participated in the 2009 Baseball World Cup, which occurred between September 9 and September 27, 2009. The team went 1–2 in the first round, losing to Mexico and Australia, but winning against Czech Republic. Chinese Taipei entered the second round as a wild card. Chinese Taipei went 5–2 in the second round, pulling off victories against Italy, Japan, Netherlands, Australia, and Mexico. The team qualified easily for the final round, but finished in 8th place, going 1–6 and losing the game for a 7th place title.

Intercontinental Cup

The team's first appearance at the Intercontinental Cup was in 1973. Since then, the team has won two bronze medals, one in 1983 in Belgium and one in 2006 in Taiwan. Taiwan did not participate in the 1975, 1979, 1981, 1993 and 1997 Intercontinental Cups. It is currently ranked 7th in the Medal Winner Ranking.
Cuba, Japan, Nicaragua and the United States remain Taiwan's four biggest rivals in the Intercontinental Cup.

As the host of the recent 2006 Intercontinental Cup, Taiwan won its second bronze medal after beating Japan in the 2006 Intercontinental Cup final 4–0.

Olympic Games

Barcelona Olympics, 1992

On 26 July 1992 and the following ten days, Chinese Taipei competed against seven other national teams from Cuba, the Dominican Republic, Italy, Japan, Puerto Rico, Spain and the United States at the 1992 Summer Olympics in Barcelona. The teams played each other seven rounds and the top four on the table advance to finals. Chinese Taipei eventually advanced to the finals, beating Japan 5–2 in the semi-finals. It struggled in the final against Cuba, suffering an enormous defeat. The score was 1–11. Nonetheless, it won a silver medal which is still now its best result ever achieved in the Olympics.

Game Summary

26 July 1992 - Round 1, Chinese Taipei defeated Italy 8–2.

27 July 1992 - Round 2, Chinese Taipei lost by one run to the United States. The final score 9–10.

28 July 1992 - Round 3, Chinese Taipei sought its second victory over the Puerto Ricans. The score was 10–1.

29 July 1992 - Round 4, Chinese Taipei dominated the Spanish. The final score was 20–0.

31 July 1992 - Round 5, Chinese Taipei beat the Dominican Republic eleven to nothing.

1 August 1992 - Round 6, Chinese Taipei faced one of its two main rivals from Asia - Japan. It acquired its fifth victory by beating Japan 2–0

2 August 1992 - Round 7, in the final round, Chinese Taipei suffered another defeat to the Cubans. This time Chinese Taipei scored only one run. The score was 1–8.

4 August 1992 - Semi-final, Chinese Taipei defeated Japan 5–2 and would play against Cuba in the final.

5 August 1992 - Final, Chinese Taipei was defeated by Cuba. Final score 1–11.

Athens Olympics, 2004

Chinese Taipei qualified for the 2004 Olympics by finishing 2nd in the Asian Baseball Championship. The team ended up finishing 5th in the tournament.

Beijing Olympics, 2008

The team qualified for the 2008 Olympics by finishing 3rd place in the Final Qualifying Tournament.

On August 15, Chinese Taipei lost to China for the first time in an international baseball event. However, it had been suspected by DPP legislators that Beijing set up the schedule unfair to Chinese Taipei. Chinese Taipei was scheduled to play the latest game the day before. It was estimated that the players could only get three hours of sleep. This allegation was rebuked by the governing party KMT as playing politics over baseball games as well as by the International Olympic Committee as common scheduling practice. The IOC further gave examples of other games being scheduled in a similar matter

The team finished 5th in the tournament.

Asian Baseball Championship 
Chinese Taipei has twice finished in first place, 10 times in second place and 10 times in third. The team competed again in the 2007 Asian Baseball Championship which was held in Taiwan.

2009 Asian Baseball Championship

In the 2009 Championship, Chinese Taipei sought their revenge against their humiliating defeat by China at the 2008 Beijing Olympics with an obliterating win of 13–1, crushing the Mainland Chinese baseball team. They proceeded on to the finals against their old time rival Japan. Japan won the match and took the title with a narrow score of 6–5, putting Chinese Taipei in second place. In the final round of the tournament, Chinese Taipei defeated 2008 Olympic baseball champions South Korea with a 5–4 victory. Their next match was played against China, whom they lost to for the first time in history at the 2008 Summer Olympics in Beijing. Chinese Taipei would end up with a 13–1 victory in 7 innings (game ended due to mercy rule) over China. The team would then play a final decisive game against their long-time rival Japan. The Japanese team won 6-5 and took the championship title, having gone 3–0 in the final round. Chinese Taipei would finish as the runner-up, with 2 wins and 1 loss in the last round of the tournament.

2019 Asian Baseball Championship

In the 2009 Championship, Chinese Taipei recorded a 2–1 record in pool play to advance to the "Super Round". They had a 4–1 record in the Super Round to advance to the championship game. Facing Japan in the championship game, Chinese Taipei prevailed, 5–4, taking the title and earning a spot in the Olympic Final Qualifying Tournament for the 2020 Summer Olympics.

Asian Games
Chinese Taipei has not missed any of the Asian Games since its first appearance in 1990 in Beijing. In Beijing, it finished in first place, however, it was a demonstration sport thus it did not receive any medals. Its second appearance was in 1994 where it finished in third place. In 1998, it again finished in third place. Chinese Taipei lost to South Korea in 2002 in Pusan, South Korea and hence finished in second. It was by far its best result. At the 2006 Asian Games in Doha, Qatar, a game-winning walk off hit by Lin Chih-sheng helped to win its first Asian Games baseball gold. The team received seventy million New Taiwan Dollar from the Republic of China (ROC)/Taiwan government for their excellent achievement in Doha. They have finished in second place at the 2010 Asian games being beaten by South Korea 7–6 in the final.

Doha Asian Games, 2006

Guangzhou Asian Games, 2010

Uniform

Honors and recognition
Asian Baseball Championship
 Gold: 1983 (Together with Japan and South Korea), 1987, 1989 (Together with Japan and South Korea), 2001, 2019
 Silver: 1955, 1969, 1985 (Together with South Korea), 2003, 2005, 2009, 2012, 2015
 Bronze: 1959, 1962, 1963, 1965, 1967, 1971, 1973, 1975, 1993, 1995, 1997, 1999
 4th: 1954, 1975
 5th: 1971
Asian Games
 Gold: 1990 (Demonstration sport), 2006
 Silver: 2002, 2010
 Bronze: 1994, 1998
Intercontinental Cup
 Bronze: 2006
Baseball World Cup
 Silver: 1984
 Bronze: 1986, 1988, 2001
 4th: 1982, 2003
 5th: 1973

Records 
 Largest win — 30 - 0 India , (Japan, 26 August 1987)
 Worst defeat — 3 - 20 the Netherlands , (Belgium, 15 July 1983)

Name controversy 
In 1954, when the team first participated in the Asian Baseball Championship, it competed under the name of United Team of Taiwan. Since the expulsion of the Republic of China from the United Nations in 1971, the National Baseball Team of the Republic of China was forced to compete internationally under the name of Chinese Taipei because of the People's Republic of China's diplomatic pressure through the One China Policy. In Taiwan it is both referred to as 中華隊 (hanyu pinyin: Zhōnghuá Duì; literally, Chinese team) or 台灣隊 (hanyu pinyin: Táiwān Duì; literally, team Taiwan ).

See also

Chinese Taipei women's national baseball team
Chinese Taipei Baseball Association
Asian Baseball Championship
Chinese Professional Baseball League
Taiwan Series
World Baseball Classic
One-China policy
Cross-Straits relations

References

External links
 Chinese Taipei Baseball Association Official Website
 The Official Website of the Beijing 2008 Olympic Games
 Taiwan Culture Portal: The pride and sorrow of Taiwan adult national baseball teams  (in English)

National baseball teams in Asia
 
Baseball